Law of the Golden West is a 1949 American Western film directed by Philip Ford and written by Norman S. Hall. The film stars Monte Hale, Paul Hurst, Gail Davis, Roy Barcroft, John Holland and Scott Elliott. The film was released on May 23, 1949, by Republic Pictures.

Plot

Cast    
Monte Hale as Bill Cody
Paul Hurst as Otis Ellis
Gail Davis as Ann Calvert
Roy Barcroft as Clete Larrabee
John Holland as Quentin Morell
Scott Elliott as Wayne Calvert
Lane Bradford as Henchman Belden
Harold Goodwin as Northerner in bar
John Hamilton as Isaac Cody

References

External links 
 

1949 films
American Western (genre) films
1949 Western (genre) films
Republic Pictures films
Films directed by Philip Ford
American black-and-white films
1940s English-language films
1940s American films